Stanley Robert Hart (born 20 June 1935 in Swampscott, Massachusetts) is an American geologist, geochemist, leading international expert on mantle isotope geochemistry, and pioneer of chemical geodynamics.

Biography
Hart graduated from MIT with a bachelor's degree in geology in 1956 and a master's degree in geochemistry in 1957 from Caltech. In 1960 he received his doctorate in geochemistry from MIT with thesis Mineral ages and metamorphism under the supervision of Patrick M. Hurley. After a year as a Carnegie Fellow, Hart was from 1961 to 1975 at the Carnegie Institution in Washington, D.C. in the Department of Terrestrial Magnetism. From 1975 to 1989 he was a professor of Earth, Atmospheric and Planetary Sciences at MIT and from 1989 to 1992 a visiting professor there. From 1989 to 2007 he was a Senior Scientist in geology and geophysics at Woods Hole Oceanographic Institution. He retired from Woods Hole in 2007 as Scientist Emeritus.

Hart is a leading pioneer in the introduction of geochemistry into the Earth sciences. He developed comparative geochronology, which accounts for geological perturbations in various geochronometers. At the Carnegie Institution of Washington, he worked with George Wetherill, George Tilton, L. T. Aldrich, and G. L. Davis on mapping Precambrian rocks in the USA using comparative geochronology. There Hart became the leader of a group including Thomas Krogh, Albrecht Hofmann, Christopher Brooks, and others.

According to Claude Allègre:

Hart focused on the application of isotopic chemistry to age determination in geology, the geochemical evolution of mantle and oceanic lithosphere, and the geochemistry of strontium, neodymium, and lead isotopes in volcanic rocks. He also studied the long-term behavior of the chemical composition of the oceans due to their interaction with the oceanic crust and the experimental determination of fundamental geochemical properties such as mineral-melt partition coefficients in silicates and solid-state diffusion rates. In 1968, together with John S. Steinhart, he published the Steinhart-Hart equation, which provides a mathematical model of how the temperature and the electrical resistance of a thermistor vary, based upon 3 so-called Steinhart-Hart coefficients.

He was a co-editor from 1970 to 1972 of the Reviews of Geophysics, from 1970 to 1976 of the Geochimica et Cosmochimica Acta, and from 1975 to 1992 of Physics of the Earth and Planetary Interiors. In 1975/76 he chaired the US National Committee for Geochemistry. His doctoral students include Erik Hauri.

Hart has three children, one daughter from his first marriage, which ended in divorce in 1978, and a son and a daughter from his second marriage which began in 1980.

Awards and honors
 1983 — Member of the National Academy of Sciences
 1985–1987 — President of the Geochemical Society
 1992 — V. M. Goldschmidt Award, Geochemical Society
 1997 — Harry Hess Medal, American Geophysical Union
 2005 — Fellow of the American Academy of Arts and Sciences
 2008 — Arthur L. Day Prize and Lectureship
 2016 — William Bowie Medal

Selected publications

References

20th-century American geologists
Massachusetts Institute of Technology School of Science alumni
California Institute of Technology alumni
Massachusetts Institute of Technology School of Science faculty
Geochemists
Members of the United States National Academy of Sciences
Fellows of the American Academy of Arts and Sciences
Fellows of the American Geophysical Union
1935 births
Living people
Presidents of the Geochemical Society
Recipients of the V. M. Goldschmidt Award